Notre Dame of Salaman College is a private Catholic secondary and higher education institution run by the Diocesan Clergy of Cotabato (DCC) in Lebak, Sultan Kudarat, Philippines. Established by the Oblates in 1965, it offers secondary, technical /vocational and degree programs.

Notable alumni
Sharifa Akeel - Beauty queen

References

Universities and colleges in Sultan Kudarat
Educational institutions established in 1965
Notre Dame Educational Association
Catholic secondary schools in the Philippines
Catholic universities and colleges in the Philippines
1965 establishments in the Philippines